Ross E. Dunn is an American historian and writer, the  author of several books including The Adventures of Ibn Battuta, and coauthor of the highly cited History on Trial: Culture Wars and the Teaching of the Past. He is Professor Emeritus at San Diego State University.

The Adventures of Ibn Battuta is based on the travels of the famous 14th-century Muslim adventurer Ibn Battuta. He traveled from Morocco in West Africa to China; however, the book mostly focuses on his travels between his hometown in Morocco to Mecca in Saudi Arabia. The book was first published in 1986 and reissued in 2005 by University of California Press.

Dunn did his graduate studies in the program in World History at the University of Wisconsin–Madison, receiving his Ph.D. in 1970. He was president of the World History Association in 1984. Dunn is currently the Co-Director for World History, working closely with the National Center for History in the Schools.

References

External links
 National Center for History in the Schools

21st-century American historians
American historical novelists
Living people
San Diego State University faculty
University of Wisconsin–Madison alumni
American male novelists
American male non-fiction writers
Year of birth missing (living people)
Presidents of the World History Association